Laugier–Hunziker syndrome is a cutaneous condition characterized by hyperpigmentation of the oral mucosa, longitudinal melanonychia, and genital melanosis.

The hyperpigmentation presented in Laugier-Hunziker syndrome is benign and should be differentiated from Peutz-Jeghers syndrome.

See also 
 Peutz–Jeghers syndrome
 List of cutaneous conditions

References 

Melanocytic nevi and neoplasms
Syndromes affecting the skin